The Miners of Donetsk or Miners of the Don is a 1951 Soviet drama film directed by Leonid Lukov. The film is about the life of miners in Donbas. New technologies are introduced which the miners embrace with enthusiasm.

Cast
 Aleksei Gribov 
 A. Mansvetov   
 G. Pasechnik  
 Viktor Khokhryakov 
 Mikheil Gelovani 
 Sergei Lukyanov 
 Vasiliy Merkurev as Gorovoi 
 Anastasiya Zuyeva 
 Vitali Doronin as Pavel Nedolya  
 Klara Luchko
 Andrei Petrov 
 Vladimir Druzhnikov as Trofimenko  
 Lidiya Smirnova as Vera  
 Oleg Zhakov 
 Pyotr Aleynikov
 Boris Chirkov as Stepan Nedolya  
 Semyon Svashenko as Engineer

References

Bibliography 
 Rollberg, Peter. Historical Dictionary of Russian and Soviet Cinema. Scarecrow Press, 2008.

External links 
 

1951 films
1951 drama films
Soviet drama films
1950s Russian-language films
Films directed by Leonid Lukov
Films scored by Tikhon Khrennikov
Soviet-era Ukrainian films